Linden Lady on the Rhine (German:Lindenwirtin am Rhein) is a 1927 German silent film directed by Rolf Randolf and starring Maly Delschaft, Carl de Vogt and Alfred Solm.

The film's art direction was by Gustav A. Knauer.

Cast
In alphabetical order
 Iris Arlan as Kellnerin Toni  
 Gerd Briese as Henning Schott  
 Gertrud de Lalsky as Fürstin Liebingen von Hohrath  
 Carl de Vogt as Dr. Allertag  
 Maly Delschaft as Lindenwirtin  
 Julius Falkenstein as Diener  
 Oskar Marion as Graf Hasso von Aich  
 Maria Matray 
 Alexander Murski as Fürst Liebingen von Hohrath  
 Fred Solm as Detlev Allertag  
 Emmy Wyda as Miß Philpotts

References

Bibliography
 Douglas B. Thomas. The early history of German motion pictures, 1895-1935. Thomas International, 1999.

External links

1927 films
Films of the Weimar Republic
Films directed by Rolf Randolf
German silent feature films
German black-and-white films
Phoebus Film films